() is a Romanian television mystery music game show based on South Korean programme I Can See Your Voice. It premiered on Pro TV on 18 July 2020.

Gameplay

Format
Presented with a group of eight "mystery singers" identified only by their occupation, a guest artist must attempt to eliminate bad singers from the group without ever hearing them sing, assisted by clues and a celebrity panel over the course of four rounds. At the end of the game, the last remaining mystery singer is revealed as either good or bad by means of a duet between them and one of the guest artists.

Rewards
If the singer is good, he/she will have release a digital single under HaHaHa Production; if the singer is bad, he/she wins 10,000 lei.

Rounds
Each episode presents the guest artist with eight people whose identities and singing voices are kept concealed until they are eliminated to perform on the "stage of truth" or remain in the end to perform the final duet.

Production
ProTV first announced the development of the series in October 2018. The staff team is managed by executive producer Dan Alexandrescu and producer Dana Mladin.

Falsez pentru tine was initially scheduled to made its debut broadcast on 4 November 2018, but it was delayed until it happened on 18 July 2020, with the airing of Jason Statham's film Parker that occupied its original premiere date. Two years prior to its rescheduled debut broadcast date, Bobonete did the programme almost cancelled due to a scandal between him and their show Las Fierbinți.

Episodes

Guest artists

Notes

References

International versions of I Can See Your Voice
2020s Romanian television series
2020 Romanian television series debuts
Pro TV original programming
Romanian television series based on South Korean television series
Romanian-language television shows